Félix Auger-Aliassime defeated Stefanos Tsitsipas in the final, 6–4, 6–2. It was his maiden ATP Tour singles title, following eight runner-up finishes in prior finals.

Andrey Rublev was the defending champion, but lost in the semifinals to Auger-Aliassime. Rublev reached his 11th consecutive quarterfinal at an ATP 500 tournament.

Seeds

Draw

Finals

Top half

Bottom half

Qualifying

Seeds

Qualifiers

Lucky loser

Qualifying draw

First qualifier

Second qualifier

Third qualifier

Fourth qualifier

References

External links
 Main draw
 Qualifying draw

2022 ATP Tour